Guru Shishyaru is a 2022 Indian Kannada-language sports drama filmwritten and directed by Jadesh K Hampi. The film stars Sharan and Nishvika Naidu in the lead roles and H. G. Dattatreya, Suresh Heblikar and Apurva Kasaravalli in supporting roles.

Plot 
In 1994–95, Manohar. K is a lethargic man and a former Kho kho national champion, who lives with his teacher Guru. After much persuasion by Guru, he joins a school at a village named Bettadapura as a PT teacher and also falls in love with a village girl Sujatha alias Sooji. However, Rudrappa, a swindler pressurises the villagers to give up the land that belonged to his grandparents before the Union government implemented the land to be given to the villagers. 

The court decides to ask the two parties to come to an agreement. However, Rudrappa, who is also a gambler, tells that he will withdraw the case if the school students can defeat his players in the yearly Kho-Kho event. Manohar gets into trouble as he and the students actually didn't win any game, but only bought trophies from the sports shop. Before Manohar and the students decide to leave the town, he learns about Guru's death and his desire to see him as a former champion again. 

Manohar begins to train them in the sport and also makes them learn about teamwork. After facing many hurdles orchestrated by Rudrappa, Manohar and the students finally defeats Rudrappa's team. With Rudrappa defeated, Manohar and the students happily celebrate with the villagers.

Cast 
 Sharan as Manohar aka MK
 Nishvika Naidu as Sujatha aka Sooji
 H. G. Dattatreya as Dattanna
 Suresh Heblikar as Nijaguna Shantappa
 Apurva Kasaravalli as Rudrappa
 Mahanthesh Hiremath as Pampapathi, peon
 Hruday Sharan as Karthik
 MS Jahangir as M.Pranesh, Headmaster
 Ekanth Prem as Seena
 Rakshak Bullet as Basha
 Manikanta Nayak as Veeranna
 Amit as Kirana
 Surya Ravishankar as Joseph
 Harshit Naveen Krishna
 Ashif Mulla

Release 
The film was released on 23 September 2022 and received positive reviews from critics.

References

External links 
 

2022 drama films
Indian sports films